This is a list of crossings of the Shannon river,  in Ireland (including bridges, tunnels, ferries and fords),  from its source in the Shannon Pot to the Shannon Estuary where the river widens before it flows into the Atlantic Ocean. Bridges not primarily intended for public use but which have limited access (generally only in the daytime and only for bicycle and foot traffic) are not included.

Crossings

References
Citations

Sources

 

Shannon
Shannon
Shannon
Shannon